Elachista ochroleuca is a moth in the family Elachistidae. It was described by Edward Meyrick in 1923. It is found in New Zealand.

The wingspan is about 10 mm. The forewings are ochreous-white with an ochreous dot on the fold towards the extremity. The hindwings are grey-whitish.

References

Moths described in 1923
ochroleuca
Moths of New Zealand
Endemic fauna of New Zealand
Taxa named by Edward Meyrick
Endemic moths of New Zealand